Daniel T. J. Mathews was a teacher, lawyer, and mail agent who served as state legislator in Mississippi. He represented Panola County, Mississippi in the Mississippi House of Representatives in 1874 and 1875. Eric Foner lists him as D. F. J. Matthews in Freedom's Lawmakers.

See also
African-American officeholders during and following the Reconstruction era

References

African-American politicians during the Reconstruction Era
African-American state legislators in Mississippi
People from Panola County, Mississippi
Year of birth missing
Year of death missing
19th-century American educators
African-American schoolteachers
Mississippi lawyers
African-American lawyers
19th-century American lawyers
Schoolteachers from Mississippi
Members of the Mississippi House of Representatives